John Burrows (October 30, 1913 – April 27, 1987) was an American professional baseball pitcher. He played in Major League Baseball (MLB) from 1943 to 1944 for the Philadelphia Athletics and Chicago Cubs.

Burrows died in an accidental house fire at his home on Weppler Road near Coal Run, Ohio. His ashes are interred in Round Bottom Cemetery, on Ohio 60 between Beverly and Coal Run.

References

External links

1913 births
1987 deaths
Baseball players from Louisiana
Major League Baseball pitchers
Philadelphia Athletics players
Chicago Cubs players
Accidental deaths in Ohio
Deaths from fire in the United States
Hammond Berries players
Clinton Blues players
Newton-Conover Twins players